Bevonium is an antimuscarinic with antispasmodic and bronchodilating properties.

References

Muscarinic antagonists
Quaternary ammonium compounds
Piperidines
Tertiary alcohols